Shakib Khan (born 28 March 1979) is a Bangladeshi film actor, producer, singer, film organiser and media personality. Khan has earned numerous accolades and become one of the most award-winning entertainers in Dhallywood with more than 30 awards including four National Film Awards, eight Meril Prothom Alo Awards, three Bachsas Awards and five CJFB Performance Awards. For the role of Surja, an independent young man in the family-drama film Bhalobaslei Ghor Bandha Jay Na (2010), he has received his first National Film Awards for Best Actor at the 35th National Film Awards in 2010. For role of Munna, a boy who deeply love his mother and got separated from his mother when he was quite young in the action drama film Khodar Pore Ma, he received his second National Film Awards for Best Actor in 2012. In 2015, he portrait as himself, a famous film star who later fall in love with a simple girl and committed suicide for her in the romantic drama Aro Bhalobashbo Tomay and earned him his third National Film Awards for Best Actor. For the role of Sabuj, a drugs addicted spoiled son of a rich man, who keeps himself out of society in romantic drama film Swatta (2017), he received his fourth National Film Awards for Best Actor.

He has won total eight Meril Prothom Alo Awards, which is the highest number of any male film actor. He received his first Meril Prothom Alo Awards for Best Actor for Amar Praner Swami for the role of Raju in 2007. In addition to this he won the award seven more times. In 2016, he portrait as Sultan alias Raghab, a disguised professional assassin with mysterious past, tasked with assassinating a top government official in the action thriller Shikari, he received his eighth Meril Prothom Alo Awards for Best Actor prior this he also earned a Tele Cine Awards for Best Actor (Bangladesh). Khan has also received an honoured as New Generation Actors at the 4th Cholochitra Mela in 2012. In 2022, he was honored with Bachsas Sammanna-2022 for his outstanding contribution to Bengali cinema.

National Film Awards

Bachsas Awards

Meril Prothom Alo Awards

Lux Channel i Performance Awards

CJFB Performance Awards

Tele Cine Awards

Television Reporters Association of Bangladesh (Trab) Awards

Bharat Bangladesh Film Awards

Channel i Digital Media Awards

Dhallywood Film and Music Awards

Other Awards and Honours 
Walton Boishakhi Star Awards
 Won: Best Actor – 2011

 BCRA award
 Won: Best Actor for Jaan Amar Jaan 2009
 Won: Best Actor 2011

Akota Awards 2005
 Nom: Best Actor for Amar Swapno Tumi

 Binodon Bichitra Award 2010
 Won: Best actor for Number One Shakib Khan

Ifad Film Club Awards
 Won: Best Actor – 2012
 Won: Best Actor and Best Couple Awards – 2017

ATN Bangla Performance Awards
 Won: Best Actor Award – 2017

 Diamond World Channel I Best Awards
 Nom: for Best Actor
 Film Awards Bangla (FAB 2010)
Also known as West Bangla and East Bangla Film Awards
 Nom: Best Actor for Amar Praner Priya 2009
 Babisas Award
 Won: Best actor for Number One Shakib Khan 2010
 Showbiz Award 2010
 Won: Best actor for Bhalobashar Lal Golap
 4th Cholochitra Mela 2012
 Special award – honoured as New Generation Actors
 Bachsas Sammanana-2022
 For outstanding contribution to Bengali cinema.

Footnotes

References

External links
 

Khan, Shakib